Yua may refer to:

 Yua (spirit), a spirit or soul in Yupik mythology
 Yua (plant), a genus of flowering plants in the family Vitaceae
 Yua Bateson, a character in the role-playing video game Breath of Fire II
You're Under Arrest! (manga), a manga created by Kōsuke Fujishima